Cap Skirring, also spelled Cap Skiring, is a town on the Atlantic Ocean coast of the Basse Casamance (Ziguinchor) region of Senegal.  It is a popular seaside resort with Europeans and has an airport and a golf course. The town was first occupied by fishermen. It was discovered by the French of Ziguinchor as a recreational beach zone in the 1960s. A landing strip for small planes was built at the end of 1960 by members of the Aero Club de Ziguinchor.

Populated places in Ziguinchor Region
Casamance